Ali Parvin (born 25 September 1946) is a retired Iranian football player and coach. He is regarded as one of the most prominent Iranian footballers. During his career, he has been associated mainly with Persepolis, played for the team for eighteen years, managed the club for seventeen years in three occasions and was also the club's president.

He was selected as one of the seventeen Asian football elites by AFC and received a statue from this confederation. He was named as one of the members of Persepolis Hall of Fame and the club thanked him for his great performance during his senior career at Persepolis. The club gave him a statue of his face and named him as one of the twelve great players of Persepolis in the 1970s.

Playing career

Club career
He was discovered whilst playing street football with neighbourhood club Aref. After being scouted he joined Alborz FC, the reserve team of Kayan FC, where he would be called up very quickly. Eventually he made his way to Paykan F.C. and was one of the star players in the team in its short run in Iranian football. He moved to Persepolis FC as many other Paykan players did after the club was dissolved in 1970. After the Iranian Revolution and during the Iran–Iraq War Parvin was instrumental in helping the Persepolis club survive. By the end of his playing career he was operating in a player/manager position. He retired from competitive football in 1988.

International career

He played for the Iran national football team and was part of the Iranian Asian Cup winning squads of 1972 and 1976.

Parvin participated in the 1972 Munich Olympics and played in all three of Iran's matches. He also participated at the 1976 Montreal Olympics, again playing in all three of Iran's matches, and he scored in the group game against Poland.

He retired from international football after Iran's exit from the 1978 World Cup in Argentina, accumulating 76 caps and 11 goals.

International goals

Career statistics

International goals

Managerial career
In late 1989 Parvin became the Iranian national team manager. He had already gained experience managing Tehran powerhouse, Persepolis FC. At first his popularity grew even more as the team won the 1990 Asian Games football gold medal, but early elimination from the 1992 Asian Cup and failure to qualify for World Cup 1994 cost him his job. He was fired in 1993 and replaced by Stanko Poklepovic.

He later became the manager of Persepolis FC and helped the team to a number of league titles. He left the team briefly in the 2003–04 season but returned the year after as the technical director of the team. After a poor start for Persepolis in the 2005–06 season he again became the manager, only to leave at the end of the season due to the club's poor form.

Statistics

List of seasons
ACW = Asian Cup Winners' Cup
TPL = Tehran Provincial League
THC = Tehran Hazfi Cup
TSC = Tehran Super Cup

Administrative roles

On 30 April 2007, Ali Parvin led the takeover of Azadegan League club Ekbatan which was renamed Steel Azin. He also became one of the members of the board of directors. He was elected as Chairman of Steel Azin on 1 December 2010 but resigned after the team was Relegated to the Azadegan League on 15 June 2011. He was also acting chairman of Persepolis from May to October 2001. As of 19 September 2011, Ali Parvin is one of the members of board of directors of Persepolis, serving for second time. On 22 January 2014, and after the resignation of Mohammad Rouyanian as the club's chairman, Parvin was appointed as the club's interim chairman.

Honours

As a player

Club
Paykan
Tehran Province League:
Winner (1): 1969

Persepolis
Iranian Football League:
Winner (3): 1972, 1974, 1976
Runner-up (3): 1975, 1977, 1978
Espandi Cup:
Winner (1): 1979
Tehran Province League:
Winner (3): 1983, 1987, 1988
Runner-up (2): 1982, 1984
Tehran Hazfi Cup
Winner (2): 1982, 1987
Runners-up (1): 1981

International
FIFA World Cup:
Group stage (1): 1978
Olympic Games:
Quarter Final (1): 1976
AFC Asian Cup:
Winner (2): 1972, 1976
Asian Games:
Gold Medal (1): 1974

As a manager
Persepolis
Asian Cup Winners' Cup:
Winner (1): 1991
Runner-up (1): 1993
Iranian Football League:
Winner (3): 1998-99, 1999-2000, 2001-02
Runner-up (3): 1989-90, 1992-93, 2000-01
Hazfi Cup:
Winner (3): 1987–88, 1991–92, 1998-99
Tehran Province League:
Winner (6): 1983, 1987, 1988, 1989, 1990, 1991
Runner-up (3): 1982, 1984, 1992
Tehran Hazfi Cup:
Winner (2): 1982, 1987

Iran
Asian Games:
Winner (1): 1990

Individual
Iranian Manager of the Year: 2000, 2002
Persepolis Hall of Fame (Manager): 2013
Golden elite of Asian Football Federation: 2013
Iranian Football Hall of Fame (Manager): 2014

He was selected as one of the seventeen Asian football elites by AFC and received a statue from this confederation. He was named as one of the members of Persepolis Hall of Fame and the club thanked him for his great performance during his senior career at Persepolis. The club gave him a statue of his face and named him as one of the twelve great players of Persepolis in the 1970s.

Personal life
Parvin married in 1976. He has two daughters and one son. His son, Mohammad Parvin is a former footballer who played for Persepolis and Paykan. He along with his wife, and the family of his children lives in house that he built in the Lavasan area, near Tehran.

References

External links

 

Iranian footballers
Iranian football managers
Iran national football team managers
1972 AFC Asian Cup players
1976 AFC Asian Cup players
1978 FIFA World Cup players
AFC Asian Cup-winning players
Footballers at the 1972 Summer Olympics
Footballers at the 1976 Summer Olympics
1992 AFC Asian Cup managers
Olympic footballers of Iran
Persepolis F.C. players
Persepolis F.C. managers
1946 births
Living people
Sportspeople from Tehran
Iranian football chairmen and investors
Iran international footballers
Asian Games gold medalists for Iran
Asian Games medalists in football
Footballers at the 1970 Asian Games
Footballers at the 1974 Asian Games
Association football midfielders
Persepolis F.C. non-playing staff
Medalists at the 1974 Asian Games
Persian Gulf Pro League managers